Faith J Eselebor, known professionally as Barbee is a singer of Jamaica and African descent.  Faith J Eselebor, the singer adopted the moniker Barbee from an early age, coined from her mother's admiration for the Mattel signature doll brand.

Early life
Barbee born Faith J Eselebor was born in New York City, and by age 11 she became the lead singer of a traveling gospel choir, Perfect Praise. In her teenage years, Barbee became a member of a girl group called Best Kept Secret.

Career
Barbee is known for her collaboration with reggae artist Junior Kelly, "Missing You" was released in 2007 and received airplay throughout the Caribbean, United States, Canada and West Africa. Later that year while working closely with Reggae artist Beenie Man she released "Paddy Cake" featuring Beenie Man, "Diva in My Sneakers", "Light Some Candles" and was also featured in Beenie Man's single and music video, "Give It Up". In 2009 she began working with reggae producer Dean Fraser and produced two singles, a cover version of Karen white's song "Can I Stay With You" and "Feel So Good". The music video for "Feel So Good" went on to receive Best Reggae Music Video at the Excellence in Music and Entertainment (EME) awards in Jamaica and was featured on the Hollywood Movie House Arrest in which Barbee also played a role as a correctional officer. Shortly after she released a follow up single titled "Just Like That". Collaborations with Rock City produced the artiste's single ‘’Whoa’’.

On the stage
In 2009 Barbee performed at the 20th Annual Susquehanna Community Festival in Philadelphia. She also performed at the Annual Jamaica Day in Toronto, Canada. Barbee was also honored as "Most Promising Female Artiste" by the Apollo Theatre for her stage presence and style.

Awards
International Reggae Awards Jamaica
2008, Best Collaborative Single Beanie Man Ft. Barbee ‘Give it Up’ (Won)

Reggae Music Awards Apollo Theater New York
2008 Most Promising Female Artist. (Won)

International European Reggae Awards
2014 Best New Artist. (Won)

References

1989 births

Dancehall musicians
21st-century Jamaican women singers

Reggae fusion artists

Living people
Musicians from Kingston, Jamaica
Jamaican reggae singers
Jamaican singer-songwriters